Travels into Several Remote Nations of the World is the first album by The Yellow Moon Band, released in 2009. The title of the album was inspired by the sub-title of Jonathan Swift's Gulliver's Travels.

Track listing
"Polaris"
"Chimney"
"Entangled" 
"Maybach"
"Focused" 
"Domini"
"Window"
"Lunadelica"

Notes
Writing Credits: The Yellow Moon Band
Musicians: Mathew Priest (Drums), Rudy Carroll (Lead Guitar, Mandolin), Danny Hagan (Bass Guitar), Jo Bartlett (Rhythm Guitar), Ali Byworth (Drums)
Cover design by Luke Insect.
The album was recorded at Bark Studios, North London by Brian O'Shaugnessy.

The Yellow Moon Band albums
2009 debut albums
Static Caravan Recordings albums